Portobuffolé or Portobuffolè  is a comune (municipality) in the province of Treviso in the Italian region Veneto, located about  northeast of Venice and about  northeast of Treviso on both the shores of the Livenza river.

Portobuffolé borders the following municipalities: Brugnera, Gaiarine, Mansuè, Prata di Pordenone. Sights include the Duomo (Cathedral), a synagogue re-consecrated in 1559. During the Middle Ages the town, of Roman origins, was under the da Carrara, the patriarchs of Aquileia, the bishops of Ceneda, the comune of Treviso (1166) and then again under the bishops of Ceneda (1242). After a period of da Camino suzerainty (1307–36), it became part of the Republic of Venice since 1339.

References

External links
 

Cities and towns in Veneto